The Tifereth Israel Synagogue is a historic building in Lincoln, Nebraska. It was built by Alfred W. Woods in 1913 as an Orthodox synagogue, and designed in the Classical Revival style by architect Fred Young, Jr.. In the 1950s, it was repurposed as a community playhouse. It was later used as an organ factory, and eventually remodeled into a residential apartment building. It has been listed on the National Register of Historic Places since May 9, 1985. Congregation Tifereth Israel moved in 1954 to a new building at 3219 Sheridan Boulevard and is currently active as a conservative synagogue.

References

Apartment buildings in Nebraska
National Register of Historic Places in Lincoln, Nebraska
Neoclassical architecture in Nebraska
Residential buildings completed in 1913
Jews and Judaism in Nebraska
Orthodox synagogues in the United States
Synagogues in Nebraska
Former synagogues in the United States
1913 establishments in Nebraska